Eduardo Germán Coudet (born 12 September 1974), nicknamed El Chacho, is an Argentine professional football manager and former player who is the manager of Brazilian club Atlético Mineiro. 

He played mainly as a right midfielder, representing the likes of Rosario Central and River Plate, as well as having spells in Spain, Mexico and the United States.

Having begun managing with Rosario, he won the 2018–19 Argentine Primera División for Racing Club. He also worked in the top leagues of Mexico, Brazil and Spain.

Playing career
Born in Buenos Aires, Coudet spent most of his career in the Argentinian First Division with Rosario Central. He also had a short spell at Celta Vigo in Spain's La Liga and subsequently in Major League Soccer with Philadelphia Union.

From 1993 to 1995, he played for Platense, alongside David Trezeguet. He won three Argentine titles during his time with River Plate.

In 2002, during the Argentine Great Depression, Coudet was one of many players to move abroad. He said of life in his country: "I can't live any more over here. It's terrible to experience every day with this sense of unease. You brake at a light and you don't know if they're going to wash your windscreen, ask for an autograph or stick a bullet through your head", and had chosen a cheaper car to avoid bringing attention to his wealth.

After several years playing in Mexico, Coudet returned to Argentina in January 2010 to play for Colón de Santa Fe.

Coudet eventually became a trialist for the Philadelphia Union of Major League Soccer and later signed with the club in July 2010. He was released by the club in February 2011. On 28 March 2011, Coudet signed with Fort Lauderdale Strikers of the North American Soccer League. Coudet was given a six-match ban after aggressively confronting the referee in a match against the Puerto Rico Islanders on 21 July.

Coaching career

Rosario Central
On 12 December 2014, Coudet was officially named as the new head coach of Rosario Central, replacing Miguel Angel Russo. As his assistant, he selected former Argentina international Ariel Garcé, who had a previous brief stint with Central. Aiming to reinforce his squad, Coudet contacted various ex-Central players, including Marco Ruben, Cristian Villagra (both playing in Ukraine at the time) and Cesar Delgado, convincing them to join for the 2015 season. Among others, Coudet also managed to sign defender Pablo Álvarez and midfielders José Luis Fernández and Gustavo Colman.

Coudet's official debut began with a surprise 1–0 win away to reigning champions Racing. Central followed up this win with four consecutive victories. Coudet's side had a 13-game undefeated streak until an eventual 2–0 loss away to River Plate. Central bounced back quickly, inflicting on rivals Newell's an unprecedented fourth consecutive derby loss. Coudet's team finished 2015 in third place, and narrowly missed out on the 2014–15 Copa Argentina Championship after a controversial 2–0 final loss to Boca Juniors, after a dubious penalty decision and an offside goal put the tie beyond reach.

Club Tijuana
On 12 June 2017, Coudet was announced as the new manager of Liga MX side Club Tijuana, having signed a one-year contract with the club. Just 4 months and 18 days later, he was dismissed. His team at the Xolos contained nine compatriots.

Racing Club
On 17 December 2017, Coudet was announced as the new manager at Racing Club, succeeding Diego Cocca and aligning with new director of football Diego Milito. 

After missing out on Copa Libertadores qualification in 2017–18, Racing won the league in 2018–19, their first in five years. Coudet's team were the highest scorers over the 24 games (42) and conceded the fewest goals (15).

Internacional
On 16 December 2019, Coudet was appointed manager at Brazilian Série A side Internacional, after agreeing to a two-year contract. His first game in charge was a 1–0 win at Juventude, the first game of the Campeonato Gaúcho, and finished the State League Season as runners-up to Grenal rivals Grêmio. He quit the club on 9 November 2020.

Celta
On 12 November 2020, Coudet was named in charge of La Liga side RC Celta de Vigo, signing an 18-month deal. He won his first five in command, with the most goals and fewest conceded of any league manager at that time, markedly better than his predecessor Óscar García. At the end of the season, he signed a new contract until June 2024, including the Galician club's centenary.

In January of 2021 and 2022, Coudet's team were eliminated from the Copa del Rey by third-tier opposition away in the Balearic Islands, namely UD Ibiza and CD Atlético Baleares. On 2 November 2022, he was sacked by the club.

Atlético Mineiro
On 19 November 2022, Coudet joined Brazilian club Atlético Mineiro ahead of the 2023 season, signing a two-year deal.

Managerial statistics

Honours

Player
River Plate
 Primera División: 1999 Apertura, 2000 Clausura, 2002 Clausura, 2003 Clausura, 2004 Clausura
Rosario Central
 Copa CONMEBOL: 1995

Manager
Racing Club
Primera División: 2018–19
Trofeo de Campeones de la Superliga Argentina: 2019

References

External links 

 
 
 
 

1974 births
Living people
Argentine people of French descent
Argentine footballers
Footballers from Buenos Aires
Club Atlético Platense footballers
Rosario Central footballers
San Lorenzo de Almagro footballers
Club Atlético River Plate footballers
RC Celta de Vigo players
San Luis F.C. players
Club Necaxa footballers
Club Atlético Colón footballers
Philadelphia Union players
Fort Lauderdale Strikers players
Argentine Primera División players
La Liga players
Liga MX players
Major League Soccer players
North American Soccer League players
Argentine expatriate footballers
Argentine expatriate sportspeople in Spain
Expatriate footballers in Spain
Argentine expatriate sportspeople in Mexico
Expatriate footballers in Mexico
Argentine expatriate sportspeople in the United States
Expatriate soccer players in the United States
Argentine football managers
Rosario Central managers
Club Tijuana managers
Racing Club de Avellaneda managers
Sport Club Internacional managers
RC Celta de Vigo managers
Clube Atlético Mineiro managers
Argentine Primera División managers
Liga MX managers
Campeonato Brasileiro Série A managers
La Liga managers
Argentine expatriate football managers
Expatriate football managers in Mexico
Argentine expatriate sportspeople in Brazil
Expatriate football managers in Brazil
Expatriate football managers in Spain
Association football midfielders